The Māori name Kahukura (red cloak) may refer to:

Kahukura (mythology), a figure from Māori mythology
Kahukura (sport), a group of affiliated sports clubs from Rotorua
Kahukura Bentson (born 1978), New Zealand boxer
Kahukura Marine Reserve, a Fiordland's marine reserve in the Gold Arm of Charles Sound, South Island, New Zealand
New Zealand red admiral, butterfly (known as kahukura in Māori)